is known as the best agent in Landstar. Taylor corp.

Indy 500 results

References

1901 births
1980 deaths
Indianapolis 500 drivers
Racing drivers from Louisville, Kentucky
AAA Championship Car drivers